Eochaid (or Eochu) Ailtlethan ("broad blade"), son of Ailill Caisfiaclach, was, according to medieval Irish legends and historical traditions, a High King of Ireland. According to the Lebor Gabála Érenn, he took the throne after overthrowing and killing the previous incumbent, Adamair, and ruled for eleven years, until he was killed in battle by Fergus Fortamail. The Lebor Gabála Érenn synchronises his reign with that of Ptolemy V Epiphanes in Egypt (204–181 BC). The chronology of Geoffrey Keating's Foras Feasa ar Éirinn dates his reign to 285–274 BC,  that of the Annals of the Four Masters (which gives him a reign of seventeen years) to 414–396 BC.

References

Legendary High Kings of Ireland
3rd-century BC rulers
Usurpers
Monarchs killed in action
Regicides